Galactia mollis, the soft milkpea, is a species of flowering plant in the southeastern United States in the family Fabaceae. It is a dicot.

References

Phaseoleae